The 1984–85 Iraq FA Cup was the ninth edition of the Iraq FA Cup as a clubs-only competition. The tournament was cancelled at the semi-final stage with Al-Rasheed, Al-Sinaa, Al-Shabab and Al-Tayaran being the four teams still remaining in the competition. Al-Tayaran had eliminated Al-Talaba in a Baghdad Derby in the quarter-finals, winning 4–3 on penalties after a 0–0 draw.

The competition was cancelled along with the 1984–85 Iraqi National League due to the national team's World Cup qualifying campaign.

References

External links
 Iraqi Football Website

Iraq FA Cup
Cup